Lectionary 51, designated by siglum ℓ 51 (in the Gregory-Aland numbering). It is a Greek manuscript of the New Testament, on paper leaves. Palaeographically it has been assigned to the 14th-century.

Description 

The codex contains lessons from the Gospels of John, Matthew, Luke lectionary (Evangelistarium), on 44 paper leaves, with some lacunae. The text is written in one column per page, in 19 lines per page, in Greek minuscule letters. The leaves are arranged in quarto, it has pictures.

History 

The manuscript was examined by Matthaei. 
Currently the codex is located in the State Historical Museum, (V. 20, S. 474) in Moscow.

The manuscript is sporadically cited in the critical editions of the Greek New Testament (UBS3).

See also 

 List of New Testament lectionaries
 Biblical manuscript
 Textual criticism

Notes and references 

Greek New Testament lectionaries
14th-century biblical manuscripts